The 2009 Seniors Torneo Godó was the fourth edition of the Seniors Torneo Godó and it took place from April 15–19, 2009.

Tie-breaks were used for the first two sets of each match, which was the best of three sets. If the score was tied at one set all, a "champions tie break" (the first player to win at least 10 points or by a margin of two points) would be used.

Marcelo Ríos was the defending champion, but did not compete this year to focus on an exhibition match against Andy Roddick.

Félix Mantilla won the title by defeating Albert Costa 6–4, 6–1 in the final. Magnus Gustafsson took the third place.

Draw
The main draw was announced on 7 April.

Group A:
  Pat Cash
  Albert Costa
  Anders Järryd
  Richard Krajicek

Group B:
  Magnus Gustafsson
  Félix Mantilla
  Cédric Pioline
  Michael Stich

Group stage

Group A

Cash had to withdraw before his match against Krajicek due to a foot injury.

Group B

Final four

Third-place playoff

Final

References

External links
 Official Results Archive of the 2009 season (ATP)  (Downloadable PDF file. Barcelona appears in page 1)

Seniors